Jennifer Jane Hocking  is an Australian historian, political scientist and biographer. She is the inaugural Distinguished Whitlam Fellow with the Whitlam Institute at Western Sydney University, Emeritus Professor at Monash University, and former Director of the National Centre for Australian Studies at Monash University. Her work is in two key areas, counter-terrorism and Australian political biography. In both areas she explores Australian democratic practice, the relationship between the arms of government, and aspects of Australian political history. Her research into the life of former Australian prime minister Gough Whitlam uncovered significant new material on the role of High Court justice Sir Anthony Mason in the dismissal of the Whitlam government. This has been described as "a discovery of historical importance". Since 2001 Hocking has been a member of the Board of Trustees of the Lionel Murphy Foundation.

Early life and education
Jenny Hocking is the daughter of Frederick Hocking, a psychiatrist with a significant practice treating survivors of long-term trauma, many of whom were Holocaust survivors, and Barbara Hocking, the first barrister briefed in the Mabo case. She was born in Melbourne, Victoria, in 1954 and attended Lauriston Girls' School and then Monash University, where she graduated with both a Bachelor of Science and subsequently a Bachelor of Economics.
 
Hocking was particularly influenced at Monash University by Professor Ian Ward, a noted economic historian. After graduating from Monash University in the late 1970s she worked as a printer for the underground Walker Press in Collingwood printing large format colour posters, political pamphlets, newsletters and booklets.

In 1977 Hocking met her partner, Daryl Dellora, a documentary filmmaker. Together they formed the film production company Film Art Doco, and have co-scripted several award-winning documentaries including Against the Innocent (1988) and Mr Neal is Entitled to be an Agitator (1991). The latter, dealing with the former High Court justice and Attorney-General Lionel Murphy, has been screened on ABC television.

Hocking holds a Doctor of Philosophy from the University of Sydney, which examined the establishment of Australia's counter terrorism framework and was published as Beyond Terrorism: The Development of the Australian Security State in 1993.

Academic career

Palace letters campaign

In 2016 Jenny Hocking commenced proceedings in the Federal Court of Australia against the National Archives of Australia seeking the release of secret correspondence between the governor-general, Sir John Kerr, and the Queen regarding the dismissal of the Whitlam government. These 'Palace letters' were held by the Archives and were under the embargo of the Queen, potentially indefinitely.  The case was unsuccessful in the Federal Court and in February 2019 an appeal to the Full Court of the Federal Court was rejected by a majority. However, in May 2020 Hocking's appeal to the High Court succeeded: in an emphatic 6:1 decision the High Court found that the Palace letters are "Commonwealth records" (not personal property) and instructed the Director-General of the National Archives to reconsider Hocking's request for access to the letters, as well as to pay all of Hocking's considerable legal costs. The letters were released in full and online on 14 July 2020.

Reaction to Hocking's research on Whitlam

As a consequence of the importance of Gough Whitlam in Australia's political history, Hocking's books about him, and featuring him, have received considerable attention from public commentators, academics and politicians. Overall, the response has been positive.
According to the judges of the Barbara Ramsden Award, the Whitlam biography was recognised as "an unusually thorough treatment and ... a monumental project ... reminiscent of the glory days of publishing".  
Its quality was also highly praised:
Frank Bongiorno called it "A fascinating and important account ... and a tour de force as a piece of history ...". 
Greg Kelton suggested it might be "the best Australian political biography In decades ... ".
Neal Blewett stated that "There is no better account of how the triumph of 1972 turned into the catastrophe of 1975."
At the launching of the book, former Labor Prime Minister of Australia Kevin Rudd says that "it lets us see who Gough Whitlam the person was before he became Gough Whitlam the politician".
Former premier of Western Australia, Carmen Lawrence, wrote: "It is a testament to Hocking’s research, her eye for the apt example, and her scholarship that she is able to expand our understanding of the man, and the influences that shaped such a significant Australia figure."

Public commentary
Hocking, a republican and member of the Australian Republican Movement executive, said of Queen Elizabeth II, “The monarchy is a very strange beast in which it’s both a political institution and a family... In fact, you know you might say in some key ways, the protection of the monarchy as an institution is actually damaging to the family as a human element. Certainly the dynamics recently have suggested that that’s the case... she’s been a figure of stability and unity in managing those really difficult human aspects and human elements.” In 2022, Hocking said King Charles III had a "very well-known tendency to engage in the political space that really monarchs and monarchs-to-be should not be engaging in", had caused "a great conservatism in architecture" and engaged in "very party-political intervention" with respect to the black spider memos when he was Prince of Wales.

Major works
Beyond Terrorism: the Development of the Australian Security State,  Sydney: Allen & Unwin, 1993,  (paperback)The author chronicles and discusses the development of Australia’s security organisations. She highlights the importance of the buzzwords” “terrorism” ,  “counter-terrorism” and “subversion”. Hocking voices concern at the way security organisations are tempted to build up their own status and "recognition", so as to gain increased government funding, sometimes by exaggerating dangers, imagined events and actual events e.g the Hilton bombing.
Lionel Murphy: A Political Biography, Melbourne: Cambridge University Press, 2000  (paperback)

The first edition of this work was published in 1997. This is new edition with a Foreword by Justice Michael Kirby and an Epilogue "Did Lionel Murphy really happen?" by the author, 2000.
The book traces Murphy's life from childhood to his role in the Labor split of the 1950s, his pioneering work as a senator and reformist Attorney-General in the Whitlam government, through to his rise to the bench of the High Court, and to his untimely death, amidst controversy, in 1986.

Terror Laws: ASIO, Counter-terrorism and the Threat to Democracy, Sydney: University of New South Wales Press, 2004. , 9780868407029
The author discusses the issue of balancing the need for national security with individual rights and freedoms. The author argues that, in the light of September 11 and Bali, the security legislation proposed, and in part passed, by the Howard government compromises the separation of powers and individual legal and political rights.
 
Frank Hardy: Politics, Literature, Life, Melbourne: Lothian Books, 2005., 
Christina Hill in the Australian Book Review describes this book as “a non-judgemental and informative life study: Hardy’s tireless political activism on behalf of the left, his work as a public figure and as a writer, his late career as a media personality, his disastrous private life (his drinking, gambling and serial adulteries) all flesh out the man and his world.” Hocking, Jenny; Frank Hardy: Politics, Literature, Life, Melbourne: Lothian Books, 2005., 

Gough Whitlam: A Moment in History, Melbourne University Publishing/Miegunyah Press: Melbourne, 2008 
This is Volume I of Gough Whitlam: The Biography. It is a biographical study of the former Labor Prime Minister of Australia. It traces his childhood in the fledgling city of Canberra, his extensive war service in the Pacific and his marriage to Margaret. The biography draws on previously unseen archival material, extensive interviews with family and colleagues, and exclusive interviews with Gough Whitlam himself. The biography describes Whitlam as an extraordinary and complex man whose life was formed by the remarkable events of previous generations of his family. It chronicles his role in changing the Australian political and cultural landscape.

Gough Whitlam: His Time, Melbourne University Publishing/Miegunyah Press: Melbourne, 2012 
This is Volume II of Gough Whitlam: The Biography. It is a new updated edition of this second book, with an additional chapter and Epilogue: “I never said I was immortal, merely eternal”, 2014.
This second volume chronicles the period when Gough Whitlam swept to power in the election of December 1972, becoming Australia’s twenty-first prime minister. The author describes the following three years during which Whitlam’s transforming political agenda unfolded. It puts on the record the non-acceptance and resentments of Whitlam’s political enemies. The narrative builds up to the dismissal of the Whitlam government by Governor-General Sir John Kerr covertly supported by Justice Sir Anthony Mason.

The Dismissal Dossier: Everything you were never meant to know about November 1975, Melbourne: Melbourne University Publishing, 2015.
This is an entirely separate work which has been updated in 2016 and 2017.
In the light of newly released documents and hitherto unavailable evidence this work covers the secret story of the planning, the people, and the collusion behind the removal of Gough Whitlam.

 The Palace Letters: The Queen, the Governor-General, and the Plot to dismiss Gough Whitlam, Melbourne: Scribe Publications, 2020

Awards 
In 2010 Hocking was elected a Fellow of the Academy of the Social Sciences in Australia. In 2013 she was awarded an Australian Research Council Discovery Outstanding Researcher Award (DORA) Fellowship Hocking was a judge of the Walkley Awards for Best Documentary Film (2014) and for the Walkley Awards Best Book (2015). From 2016 to 2021 she was a judge of the Hazel Rowley Literary Fellowship.

Hocking was appointed a Member of the Order of Australia in the 2023 Australian Honours for "significant service to the preservation of Australian political history".

Other awards and honours include:
Lionel Murphy: A Political Biography was short-listed for the 1998 South Australian Festival Awards for Literature non-fiction award.
Frank Hardy: Politics, Literature, Life was short-listed for the  NSW Premier's History Awards, State Records Prize in 2006; 
Gough Whitlam: A Moment in History was short-listed in 2009 for The Age Book of the Year Award, the Queensland Premier's History Awards and the Prime Minister's Literary Awards, and long-listed in the Walkley Awards. 
In 2012 Gough Whitlam: His Time won the FAW Barbara Ramsden Award in 2014 and was shortlisted in the Prime Minister's Literary Awards (Australian History prize), the Queensland Literary Awards (non-fiction award) and the National Biography Award, and long-listed in The Nib Waverley Library Award for Literature.
1999–2005 Professor Hocking was honoured as an Australian Research Council QEII Postdoctoral Fellow. 
In 2002 she was conferred as a Harold White Fellow at the National Library of Australia.

Bibliography

Books

Essays and reporting

Critical studies and reviews of Hocking's work 
The Palace Letters

References

External links 
 
 

1954 births
Living people
Academics from Melbourne
Australian biographers
Australian women historians
Australian historians
Members of the Order of Australia
Fellows of the Academy of the Social Sciences in Australia
Australian women academics
Academic staff of Western Sydney University
Women biographers
1975 Australian constitutional crisis
People educated at Lauriston Girls' School
Academic staff of Monash University